Morne Jaloux Ridge is a town in Saint George Parish, Grenada.  It is located towards the southern end of the island, to the north of Morne Jaloux.

References 

Populated places in Grenada